Marius Sowislo (born 14 November 1982) is a Polish former professional footballer who played as a midfielder.

Career
Sowislo was born in Bytom in Poland, but spent most of his footballing career in Western Germany, starting with his youth club VfL Bochum.

He first played senior football for DJK TuS Hordel, before moving on to Wuppertaler SV. After spending a year in Wuppertal, Sowislo joined Preußen Münster where he played in 84 competitive matches, scoring 23 goals. 
He joined 1. FC Kleve after his stint with Preußen Münster, where he was reunited with manager Georg Kreß who he had worked under in Münster and Wuppertal. initially signing a one-year contract. In January 2011, Sowislo moved on to then fifth-tier side Sportfreunde Siegen, signing a contract until June 2012. However, his time at Siegen was marred by two injuries and he only played in 18 league matches and saw his contract not extended at the end of the 2011–12 season, when Siegen won promotion to the Regionalliga West.

Eventually, Sowislo joined 1. FC Magdeburg in July 2012, moving outside Western Germany for the first time, eventually becoming the side's captain. He led the team to promotion to the 3. Liga and into professional football for the first time since German reunification. He extended his contract until June 2016.

Sowislo retired from playing at the end of the 2017–18 season.

Honours

Club
1. FC Magdeburg
 Regionalliga Nordost: 2015
 3. Liga: 2018

References

External links
 

1982 births
Living people
Sportspeople from Bytom
Polish footballers
German footballers
Association football midfielders
Wuppertaler SV players
SC Preußen Münster players
1. FC Kleve players
Sportfreunde Siegen players
1. FC Magdeburg players
3. Liga players